Bruce Wright may refer to:
 Bruce A. Wright (born c. 1951), United States Air Force general
 Bruce M. Wright (1917–2005), American jurist